Penicillium salamii is a species of fungus in the genus Penicillium which occurs on dry-cured meat products.

References

Further reading 
 

salamii